Matilda Obaseki is a Nigerian film actress and scriptwriter. She is the lead actress in the award-winning TV series, Tinsel.

Early life
Obaseki was born on 19 March 1986 in Benin City, Oredo Local Government Area, Edo State where she grew up. She is the youngest of seven children.

Personal life
Obaseki married Arnold Mozia in Benin City on 21 September 2013 after having her first child a year before on 31 August 2012. She gave birth to a second baby boy on 1 January 2015.

Education 
Obaseki grew up in Benin City, where she had her Primary and Secondary School Education. She quit studying English at the University of Benin to focus on her acting career.

Career 
Obaseki began her acting career in 2007 but is mostly known for her performance in the soap opera Tinsel, where she plays Angela Dede. Before Tinsel, she played the role of the maid in the TV program US, appearing in three episodes. Her first movie was the 2014 film, A Place in the Stars, where she worked alongside Gideon Okeke and Segun Arinze. she was also in the movie getting over Him alongside Majid Michel.

Awards and nominations

References

Living people
Nigerian film actresses
1968 births
People from Benin City
Actresses from Edo State
Nigerian screenwriters
University of Benin (Nigeria) alumni
Nigerian filmmakers
Edo people